Pippi Longstocking (orig. Pippi Långstrump) is a 1949 Swedish film directed by Per Gunvall and starring Viveca Serlachius as Pippi Longstocking.  It is based on the famous children's novel of the same name by Astrid Lindgren.

Cast 
Viveca Serlachius as Pippi Longstocking
Tord Garnmark as Tommy
Berit Essler as Annika
Benkt-Åke Benktsson as Efraim Långstrump
Svend Asmussen as Postman
Julia Cæsar as School teacher
Doreen Denning as Birgit
Sigge Fürst as Valle Dunder-Karlsson
Emy Hagman as Mrs. Settergren
Stig Järrel as Record Dealer
Arne Källerud as Policeman Larsson
Carl-Gustaf Lindstedt as Piano salesman
Gustaf Lövås as Policeman Karlsson
Mona Mårtenson as Pia
Carl Reinholdz as Ville Blom

References

External links

1949 films
1949 comedy films
1940s Swedish-language films
Films set in Sweden
Films based on Pippi Longstocking
1949 in Sweden
Swedish comedy films
Swedish black-and-white films
1940s Swedish films